The Glencoe River is a river in the Canterbury region of New Zealand. It arises in the Organ Range near Shale Peak and flows south into the Mandamus River.

See also
List of rivers of New Zealand

References

Land Information New Zealand - Search for Place Names

Hurunui District
Rivers of Canterbury, New Zealand
Rivers of New Zealand